Planaria is a genus of planarians in the family Planariidae. When an individual is cut into pieces, each piece has the ability to regenerate into a fully formed individual.

Description 
Currently the genus Planaria is defined as freshwater triclads with oviducts that unite to form a common oviduct without embracing the bursa copulatrix and with an adenodactyl present in the male atrium. The testes occur along the whole body.

Planaria originally have habitats in dark, murky water which results in such sensitivity (Paskin et al., 2014). They are also sensitive to other stimuli such as chemical gradients, vibration, magnetic and electric fields (Deochand et al., 2018). Their central nervous system includes the anterior (head, brain and eyes) and middle (abdominal trunk and pharynx) (Deochand et al., 2018).

Diet 
The food of Planaria species includes freshwater gastropods, tubificid worms, and freshwater arthropods, such as isopods of the genus Asellus and chironomid larvae. In the United Kingdom, P. torva is a successful predator of the invasive New Zealand mud snail (Potamopyrgus jenkinsi).

Species
The following species are recognised in the genus Planaria:
 

Planaria adhaerens 
Planaria albocingata 
Planaria barroisi 
Planaria bicingulata 
Planaria chulunginensis 
Planaria cincinata 
Planaria cinerea 
Planaria dagarensis 
Planaria debilis 
Planaria delineata 
Planaria dybouskyi 
Planaria flava 
Planaria fontana 
Planaria fuliginosa 
Planaria fuliginosus 
Planaria fulvifrons 
Planaria fuscomaculata 
Planaria gigas 
Planaria grubii 
Planaria ignorata 
Planaria incerta 
Planaria kempi 
Planaria lemani 
Planaria lucta 
Planaria luteola 
Planaria macrocephala 
Planaria maculata 
Planaria marmorosa 
Planaria melanocerca 
Planaria melanopunctata 
Planaria melanotorquis 
Planaria nesidensis 
Planaria onegensis 
Planaria punctatum 
Planaria rosea 
Planaria rothii 
Planaria sabussowi 
Planaria savignyi 
Planaria semifasciata 
Planaria simplex 
Planaria sinensis 
Planaria subflava 
Planaria torva 
Planaria tremellaris 
Planaria unionicola 
Planaria verrucosa 
Planaria wytegrensis 
Planaria zeylanica

Uses of planaria in research 
Planaria has been widely used as a model invertebrate organism in pharmacological research, in particular in the studies of the drugs of abuse. Due to its excellent ability to regenerate, planaria has also been used as a model in regeneration studies. It was also proposed as a model in toxicological research.

References 

Deochand, N., Costello, M. S., & Deochand, M. E. (2018). Behavioral Research with Planaria. Perspectives on behavior science, 41(2), 447–464. https://doi.org/10.1007/s40614-018-00176-w

Continenticola
Rhabditophora genera